Here is a list of the songs recorded in studio (not covers or live versions), that were released by the South Korean contemporary R&B quintet idol boy group Shinee. The group is known for having released over 100 songs under the record labels of SM Entertainment and EMI Records.

Songs

References

 
Shinee